Highway 120 (AR 120, Ark. 120, and Hwy. 120) is an east–west state highway in Mississippi County, Arkansas. The route is maintained by the Arkansas Department of Transportation (ArDOT).

Route description
Highway 120 begins at US 61 in eastern Mississippi County within the Arkansas Delta. The route runs east before turning north to Double Bridges, when it turns east and runs as a section line road. Highway 120 crosses Bear Bayou before terminating at County Road 903, which runs along a levee for the Canadian Reach of the Mississippi River.

History
The highway was created after the original 1926 Arkansas state highway numbering, first appearing on the 1927 highway map.

Major intersections

See also

References

External links

120
Transportation in Mississippi County, Arkansas